Asdrúbal José Cabrera (born November 13, 1985) is a Venezuelan-American professional baseball infielder who is currently a free agent. He has played in Major League Baseball (MLB) for the Cleveland Indians, Washington Nationals, Tampa Bay Rays, New York Mets, Philadelphia Phillies, Texas Rangers, Arizona Diamondbacks and Cincinnati Reds. Cabrera, a switch hitter, is a two-time All-Star. He was primarily a middle infielder for most of his career, but transitioned to playing more third base during the 2017 season and began playing first base late in the 2019 season.

Early life
Cabrera was raised by his parents, Asdrúbal, a truck driver, and Zunilde, a homemaker, in Puerto la Cruz, Venezuela. According to his family, Cabrera began switch hitting at three years old. In his youth, Cabrera closely followed Venezuelan shortstop Omar Vizquel's career. At 15 or 16 years old, he made a deal with his father that he would leave school and focus on baseball. If he were not signed within a year, he would return to school. At 15 years old he caught the attention of Seattle Mariners scout Emilio Carrasquel.

Professional career

Cleveland Indians

Cabrera was signed by the Seattle Mariners as an amateur free agent in 2002.

After coming up through the Mariners organization, he was acquired by the Cleveland Indians on June 30, 2006, in exchange for Eduardo Pérez. Cabrera spent the remainder of the 2006 season at Cleveland's Triple-A minor league team, the Buffalo Bisons.

Cabrera was a non-roster invitee to the Indians 2007 spring training but was reassigned to their minor league camp March 16. He started 2007 at Double-A with the Akron Aeros and was named to the Eastern League mid-season All-Star team. He was promoted to the Indians' Triple-A affiliate, Buffalo Bisons July 30 and then to Cleveland August 7.

Cabrera made his major league debut on August 8, 2007, against the White Sox, starting at second base. He was hitless in three at-bats and scored a run after he was hit by a pitch in the sixth inning. Four days later, Cabrera picked up his first major league hit, a double, against Mike Mussina of the New York Yankees. Cabrera's first home run came August 18, 2007, off Jason Hammel of the Tampa Bay Devil Rays in an 8–1 victory for the Indians. Cabrera eventually assumed Cleveland's everyday second baseman job despite being a natural shortstop, taking over for an ineffective Josh Barfield. In 2007, Cabrera helped power the Indians to a tie for the best record in baseball (96–66 with the Boston Red Sox) with his late-inning heroics. Cabrera batted .375 (21 for 56) in the 7th inning or later. For good luck, Cabrera wears a white beaded necklace that was made for him by his wife; because of this many gave him the nickname "Pearls".

At Progressive Field on May 12, 2008, Cabrera turned the 14th unassisted triple play in MLB history against the Toronto Blue Jays in the second game of a doubleheader. In the fifth inning, with Toronto's Marco Scutaro on first base and Kevin Mench on second, Cabrera dove and caught a Lyle Overbay liner, stepped on second base before leading runner Mench could return, and then tagged Scutaro, who had already passed second base. Hall of Fame member Bob Feller was in attendance to witness Cabrera's feat. On June 9, 2008, Cabrera was optioned to Triple-A Buffalo after hitting a team low .184 with 14 RBI in 52 games. Barfield was called back up to take his place. During his stay in Buffalo, Cabrera hit .326 in 34 games with 25 runs, seven doubles, four homers and 13 RBI. He was also named International League Batter of the Week after hitting .394, going 13 for 33, with three doubles, three homers and six RBI. Cabrera was called back up to the Indians on July 18, and hit .261 (30 for 115) with 3 homers, to raise his season average (with the Indians) from .184 to .216.

Cabrera hit his first career grand slam against New York Yankees' pitcher Anthony Claggett to cap a 14-run second inning for the Indians on April 18, 2009 at the new Yankee Stadium, and had a career-high four hits with five RBIs as the Indians went on to win 22–4.  May 17, 2010 at Tropicana Field he suffered a broken left forearm that landed him on the 60-day disabled list. He later made two rehab starts on July 12 and 13, 2010 with the Mahoning Valley Scrappers, the Indians' Short-Season A affiliate, going a combined 2-for-6 with a walk, double, and 2 RBI in both games, the first a 10–5 loss and second a 4–2 win at Eastwood Field. Cabrera began his stint with the AA Akron Aeros on July 15, 2010 for more rehab work, before he was activated from the 60-day disabled list on July 20.

During the 2011, Cabrera hit 25 home runs (Indians record for a shortstop) and drove in 92 RBIs, both career highs. He also hit for a .273 average and stole 17 bases, while making several highlight plays at the shortstop position. For his heroics, he earned his first All-Star appearance while receiving the Silver Slugger Award and the Indians Heart and Hustle Award. He was also named the team's Man of the Year by the Cleveland Chapter of the Baseball Writers' Association of America.

On February 10, 2012, Cabrera signed a one-year, $4.55 million deal with the Indians to avoid arbitration. In the process, Cabrera filed for $5.2 million, but the Indians submitted $3.75 million. He was the final Indian eligible for arbitration to be under contract, and he was under team control through 2013.

On April 1, 2012, Cabrera agreed to a two-year, $16.5 million extension with a one-year club option that keeps him under Cleveland's control through 2014. On June 19, 2012, he hit a walk-off two-run home run off of Cincinnati Reds' closing pitcher Aroldis Chapman in the tenth inning, giving the Indians a 3–2 victory. It was Cabrera's second walk-off home run of his career. Cabrera was selected to appear in the 2012 MLB All-Star Game on July 1, 2012, as a reserve shortstop, joining teammate Chris Perez as one of two Indians voted to appear in the Midsummer Classic. Between the beginning of July and July 17, Cabrera's batting average had dropped 26 points (.300 on July 1 to .274 on July 17). Cabrera would record his first three-hit game since June 30 when he went 3 for 5 on July 18 in a win versus the Tampa Bay Rays. Two days later Cabrera would hit his first home run of July and first since June 29 when he hit a solo shot against the Baltimore Orioles on July 20. By July 22, however, Cabrera's batting average reached a season-low .272.

On June 3, 2013, Cabrera strained his right quadriceps while running to first base during a 7–4 loss against the New York Yankees at Yankee Stadium and was placed on the 15-day disabled list. He was activated from the disabled list on June 26.

Washington Nationals
On July 31, 2014, the Indians traded Cabrera to the Washington Nationals for Zach Walters. Cabrera finished the 2014 season playing in 146 games with a batting average of .241 in 553 at-bats in 616 plate appearances while compiling 133 hits, 49 walks, 61 RBIs, 14 home runs and 74 runs scored with both the Indians and Nationals.

Tampa Bay Rays
On December 30, 2014, Cabrera signed a one-year, $7.5 million contract with the Tampa Bay Rays. Cabrera finished the 2015 season playing in 143 games with a batting average of .265 in 505 at-bats in 551 plate appearances while compiling 134 hits, 36 walks, 58 RBIs, 15 home runs and 66 runs scored.

New York Mets

On December 10, 2015, Cabrera signed a two-year, $18.5 million contract with the New York Mets. His 2 year deal included a 3rd year team option which was exercised on November 3, 2017 at $6.5 million. On July 31, 2016, Cabrera strained the patellar tendon in his left knee while rounding third base against the Colorado Rockies. He was placed on the disabled list on August 2. He returned from the disabled list on August 19. He was named National League Player of the Week for the week ending August 27.

Philadelphia Phillies
On July 27, 2018, Cabrera was traded to the Philadelphia Phillies in exchange for minor leaguer Franklyn Kilome. He made his Phillies debut a day later going 0 for 4 as the shortstop in a game versus the Cincinnati Reds. With the Phillies, he batted .228/.286/.392.

Texas Rangers
On January 24, 2019, Cabrera signed a one-year contract with the Texas Rangers. On August 1, Cabrera was designated for assignment. On August 3, the Rangers released Cabrera. He batted .235/.318/.393 with Texas.

Second stint with the Washington Nationals

On August 6, 2019, Cabrera signed with the Washington Nationals. In 2019 with the Nationals he batted .323/.404/.565 in 124 at bats. Between Texas and Washington combined, in 2019 he batted .260/.342/.441 with 18 home runs and 91 RBIs in 447 at bats. The Nationals won the 2019 World Series, with Cabrera figuring on their roster at every stage of the postseason. He started at second base in the decisive Game 7 on October 30, 2019, at Minute Maid Park as the Nationals won the game 6-2, giving them their first championship in franchise history. He signed a new major league contract to stay with Washington for the 2020 season. Cabrera played 52 games for Washington in 2020, slashing .242/.305/.447 with 8 home runs and 31 RBI over 190 at-bats.

Arizona Diamondbacks
On February 21, 2021, Cabrera agreed to a one-year, $1.75M contract with the Arizona Diamondbacks. In 90 games for the Diamondbacks, Cabrera hit .244 with 7 home runs and 40 RBI's.

Cincinnati Reds
On August 27, 2021, Cabrera was claimed off of waivers by the Cincinnati Reds. He became a free agent following the 2021 season.

Personal life
Cabrera resides in Miami, Florida, with his wife, Lismar, and his son Meyer and daughter Ashley. He and his wife met in school in Venezuela and were married in 2007.

In April 2019 Cabrera and his wife became American citizens.

See also
 List of Major League Baseball players from Venezuela

References

External links

Asdrúbal Cabrera at Ultimate Mets Database
Asdrúbal Cabrera at Pura Pelota (Venezuelan Professional Baseball League)
 Asdrúbal Cabrera Mahoning Valley Scrappers (Stats, Highliggts, Bio

1985 births
Living people
Akron Aeros players
American League All-Stars
American sportspeople of Venezuelan descent
Arizona Diamondbacks players
Binghamton Rumble Ponies players
Buffalo Bisons (minor league) players
Cardenales de Lara players
Cincinnati Reds players
Cleveland Indians players
Everett AquaSox players
Inland Empire 66ers of San Bernardino players
Leones del Caracas players
Mahoning Valley Scrappers players
Major League Baseball players from Venezuela
Venezuelan expatriate baseball players in the United States
Major League Baseball second basemen
Major League Baseball shortstops
New York Mets players
People from Puerto la Cruz
Philadelphia Phillies players
Silver Slugger Award winners
Tacoma Rainiers players
Tampa Bay Rays players
Texas Rangers players
Venezuelan emigrants to the United States
Washington Nationals players
Wisconsin Timber Rattlers players
World Baseball Classic players of Venezuela
2013 World Baseball Classic players